Richard Cutts Shannon (February 12, 1839 – October 5, 1920) was a U.S. Representative from New York.

Biography
Born in New London, Connecticut, Shannon was graduated from the grammar and high schools at Biddeford, Maine, and from Waterville College (now Colby College), Maine.
During the Civil War enlisted in Company H, Fifth Regiment, Maine Volunteer Infantry, June 24, 1861.
He was appointed first lieutenant October 10, 1861.
He served as aide-de-camp to General Slocum March 15, 1862.
He served as captain and assistant adjutant general of Volunteers October 2, 1862.
Honorably discharged February 10, 1866.
He was appointed secretary of the United States legation at Rio de Janeiro, Brazil, in 1871, and served until March 1875, when he resigned.
Took charge of the Botanical Garden Railroad Co. in 1876, an American enterprise in Brazil, of which he subsequently became the vice president, general manager, and president.
He returned to the United States in 1883 and was graduated from the law department of Columbia College, New York City, in 1885.
He was admitted to the New York bar in 1886 and commenced practice in New York City.
He was appointed Envoy Extraordinary and Minister Plenipotentiary to Nicaragua, El Salvador, and Costa Rica in 1891, and served until April 1893.

Shannon was elected as a Republican to the Fifty-fourth and Fifty-fifth Congresses (March 4, 1895 – March 3, 1899).
He declined to be a candidate for renomination in 1898.
He resumed the practice of his profession in New York City.
He retired in 1903 and moved to Brockport, New York, where he died October 5, 1920.
He was interred in Lake View Cemetery.

References
 Retrieved on 2008-02-15

External links

1839 births
1920 deaths
Colby College alumni
Ambassadors of the United States to Brazil
Union Army officers
Ambassadors of the United States to Costa Rica
Ambassadors of the United States to Nicaragua
Ambassadors of the United States to El Salvador
19th-century American diplomats
Republican Party members of the United States House of Representatives from New York (state)
Columbia College (New York) alumni